Joel Hayden (April 8, 1798 – November 10, 1873), was an American industrialist and politician who served as the 26th Lieutenant Governor for the Commonwealth of Massachusetts from 1863 to 1866.

In 1857, Amherst College accepted a gift from Joel Hayden – a bronze neo-classical sculpture named after Sabrina, Goddess of the Britons.

Hayden owned several business and mills in Haydenville, Massachusetts, a borough of Williamsburg, Massachusetts, including a brass factory, gas works, cotton factory, and foundry. He was also a part-owner of the Williamsburg Reservoir Company, which built the shoddy Williamsburg Reservoir, completed in 1866. On May 16, 1874, several months after Hayden's death, the dam failed catastrophically, causing a flood that killed 139 people and destroyed all four of Hayden's factories.

References

External links

1798 births
1873 deaths
Lieutenant Governors of Massachusetts
Massachusetts Republicans
People from Williamsburg, Massachusetts
19th-century American politicians